Racing Club Flèchois is a French football club based in La Flèche. As of the 2020–21 season, the club plays in Régional 1 Pays de la Loire, following relegation from 2019–20 Championnat National 3. The club also has a women's team which currently play in the Sarthe district league.

History 
 1953 : Fusion of the two football clubs in La Flèche (La Flèche Sportive and AS Bellegarde) to form Union Sportive Fléchoise.
 1976 : Fusion of two new football clubs in La Flèche (Union Sportive Fléchoise and Sporting Club Fléchois).
 1995 : Separation of the football club from the rest of the multi-sports club of Union des Sports Fléchois to form Racing Club Fléchois.
 1996 : First promotion to the Nationale 2, which lasted for one season.
 2002 : New promotion to CFA, again, for one season.

Honours 
 1986 – 1987 : Champion of DH in the Maine
 1990 – 1991 : Cup winners in the Maine
 1995 – 1996 : First in the group for National 3
 2001 – 2002 : First in the group for CFA 2

Men's Coupe de France 
The best result for the club was reaching the last 32 in 1995–1996, when they were beaten by Martigues, in 2001–2002, when they were beaten by Châteauroux, and in 2004–2005, when they were beaten by Libourne-Saint-Seurin.

 2008 – 2009 : Lost in 5th round to E.S. Bonchamp

Women's Challenge de France 
 2008 – 2009 : Lost in 2nd round to F.A. Laval

Players

Current squad

Coaches

References

External links 
  Official club site
  Club at footballenfrance.fr
  Club at les-sports.info

Fleche
1995 establishments in France
Association football clubs established in 1995
Football clubs in Pays de la Loire